Vovinam at the 26th Southeast Asian Games was held in Jakarta, Indonesia.

Participating nations
Athletes from 4 nations were scheduled to participate.

Medal summary

Men

Women

Mixed

Medal table 

2011 Southeast Asian Games events